Evynne Hollens (née Smith; born July 29, 1983) is a female vocalist who lives and works in her native Eugene, Oregon. She was one of the co-founders of the University of Oregon’s female a cappella group, Divisi, with which she sang for five years. Her name is the first word in the first chapter of the book Pitch Perfect, on which the movie of the same title is based. Her and Divisi’s adventures at the 2005 International Championship of Collegiate A Cappella Finals make up a major portion of the book. She is married to Peter Hollens and they have two sons, Ashland James Hollens born in 2014 and Saylor James Hollens born in 2018.

Career
In 2013 Evynne played Lucy in Avenue Q and Natalie in Next to Normal at the Oregon Contemporary Theatre. From January 15 to February 6, 2016 she performed the role of Cathy in The Last Five Years.

In April 2015 she directed a musical production of Beauty and the Beast at the Rose Children's Theater.

Evynne has been involved with over 20 productions at The John G. Shedd Institute for the Arts ("The Shedd") over the last fifteen years. Among them, she created and performed in The Contemporary Songbook Project, played Nanette in No, No, Nanette, and was in Hear My Song on May 30–31, 2015.

Evynne performed at The Shedd in her show "Evynne Hollens: Real Broadway," The Contemporary Songbook Project V, which was presented April 27 to April 29, 2018, at the Jaqua Concert Hall. This will include Milagro, a bilingual musical written by her and Portland singer-songwriter Anna Gilbert.

Evynne and Peter debuted on Broadway in the show "Home For the Holidays, Live on Broadway" which was presented November 17 to December 30, 2017, at the August Wilson Theatre.

Besides live performances Evynne is an up-and-coming YouTube artist, with music videos and a weekly vlog. She often collaborates with her husband Peter Hollens and with pianist Nathan Alef. She has recorded a number of showtunes including "Somewhere" from West Side Story and "Defying Gravity" from Wicked. Her "Shake it Out/Shake it Off" mashup received over 200,000 views in the first four days of its release and was featured on Buzzfeed and Mashable. Her "Taylor Swift 1989 in 4 Minutes" collaboration with Peter attracted even more interest, provoking at least seven articles in three different languages on Mashable, BillBoard, Fascinately, Deseret News, Melty, Virgin Radio, and El Comercio.

These have been eclipsed by her "Evolution of the Disney Princess" medley which received over 1,000,000 views in the week following its release on March 3, 2016. This video features segments of Evynne performing as 14 Disney princesses, from Snow White (from the movie of the same name) to Elsa (from Frozen), spanning the period from 1937 to 2013. Articles about this video appeared on Time.com, Teen Vogue Pop Buzz, BuzzFeed and on the "Oh My Disney" blog on Disney.com. The video has since amassed over 14 million views. She continues to release covers of Disney, musical theater and contemporary music, often alongside her husband. Her son, Ashland, has appeared in several of these.

References

External links 
 
 
 Evynne Hollens Patreon Page

Singers from Oregon
Living people
Musicians from Eugene, Oregon
University of Oregon people
American YouTubers
Music-related YouTube channels
Music YouTubers
YouTube channels launched in 2013
1977 births